Lachnus roboris is a species of insect belonging to the family Aphididae.

It is native to Europe.

References

Aphididae